Nirmal Jani is an Indian cinematographer working in the Bollywood film industry based in Mumbai.

He debuted as cinematographer in filming the 1991 film Patthar Ke Phool under director Anant Balani and starring Salman Khan.

Filmography
[Multani bharjai] (1985)
Patthar Ke Phool (1991)
Kshatriya (1993)
Dushmani: A Violent Love Story (1995)
Sarhad: The Border of Crime (1995)
Haqeeqat (1995)
Border (1997)
Dushman (1998)
Pyaar To Hona Hi Tha (1998)
Zakhm (1998)
Hadh Kar Di Aapne (2000)
Raju Chacha (2000)
Kuch Khatti Kuch Meethi (2001)
Kranti (2002)
Tum Se Achcha Kaun Hai (2002)
Sur: The Melody of Life (2002)
Chori Chori (2003)
Deewaar (2004)
Blackmail (2005)
Humko Tumse Pyaar Hai (2006)
Hope and a Little Sugar (2006)
Hattrick (2007)
One Two Three (2008) 
Toonpur Ka Super Hero (2010)

External links
 
 http://www.nirmaljani.com/

Year of birth missing (living people)
Living people
Cinematographers from Maharashtra
Hindi film cinematographers